Tarsykiya Matskiv (23 March 1919 – 17 July 1944) was an ethnic Ukrainian Greek Catholic nun and martyr.

Matskiv was born in Khodoriv, Lwów Voivodeship (now Lviv Oblast).  She entered the Sister Servants of Mary Immaculate on 3 May 1938.  She took her first vows on 5 November 1940, and worked in her convent, sewing clothes for the sisters and teaching others the skill. Even before the arrival of the Soviet Army to Lviv, she took vows before her spiritual director, Volodymyr Kovalyk, that she would give up her life for the conversion of Russia and for the Catholic Church.

On 17 July 1944 at around 8 a.m., a Russian soldier rang the convent door. When Matskiv answered the door, expecting to see a priest who was supposed to celebrate the liturgy,  she was shot without warning and died.  It was later said that she was shot simply "because she was a nun".

She was beatified by Pope John Paul II on 27 June 2001.

Quote 
"Suddenly the bell rang. We thought it was the priest. Sister Tarsykiia opened the door, asked Sister Maria for the key to the front door and went to the main entrance. Then a shot rang out and Sister Tarsykiia fell down dead. The soldier who shot her dead did not really explain why he did it. Later they said that he said he killed her because she was a nun." - From the testimony Sister Daria Hradiuk.

References 

1919 births
1944 deaths
Members of the Ukrainian Greek Catholic Church
Ukrainian beatified people
Ukrainian people executed by the Soviet Union
20th-century Eastern Catholic martyrs
Soviet nuns
People from Khodoriv
People executed by the Soviet Union by firearm
Executed Ukrainian people
Eastern Catholic beatified people
Ukrainian nuns
20th-century Eastern Catholic nuns